The 2006 African Women's Handball Championship was the 17th edition of the African Women's Handball Championship, held in Tunisia from 12 to 20 January 2006. It acted as the African qualifying tournament for the 2007 World Women's Handball Championship.

Preliminary round
All times are local (UTC+1).

Group A

Group B

Knockout stage

Bracket

Semifinals

Fifth place game

Third place game

Final

Final ranking

External links
Results on todor66.com

2006 Women
African Women's Handball Championship
African Women's Handball Championship
African Women's Handball Championship
2006 in African handball
January 2006 sports events in Africa
Women's handball in Tunisia
2006 in African women's sport